Dead Dog Beach, also known as Sato Beach and officially named Playa Lucia, is a beach within the municipality of Yabucoa in southeastern Puerto Rico. Its "Dead Dog Beach" (La Playa de los Perros Muertos) came because it was the dumping ground for stray animals, mainly dogs that the inhabitants of Yabucoa could no longer afford. Most dumped animals were not spayed or neutered.

Dead Dog Beach was known for having one of the highest concentrations of stray animals in Puerto Rico. It attracted animal rights activists and groups hoping to make a difference. One example is The Sato Project, a large-scale rescue project which focuses its efforts on Sato Beach in Yabucoa. Many individuals who come are so moved by these animals' living conditions that they extend their stay to help. Various rescue projects focus on the island's development. Many of these efforts were prompted by abuse of animals, even by local authorities, as in the Barceloneta Massacre in 2007.

As of 2014, a gate was put up to deny access to people who would dump dogs on the beach and Sato Project regularly monitors the beach for strays.

Geography and climate 

Puerto Rico, mainly a 90-by-30 mile island located in the Caribbean region, includes smaller islands off of its eastern coast. Its average temperatures range from 70-80 degrees Fahrenheit. Its beaches stretch for hundreds of miles. Along the northern coasts, are cliffs and a region known as the Karst region. This region contains notable land features such as caves, caverns, waterfalls, underground rivers and rain forests. Puerto Rico has the largest and deepest trench in the Atlantic Ocean, known as the Puerto Rico Trench. Notable rivers include the Guayanes River extends for 17 miles, as well as the Prieto, Arenas, Limones and Ingenio Rivers.

Yabucoa is surrounded on three sides by the San Lorenzo Batholith and the Caribbean Sea. It is humid and mainly flat. Mountain ranges in this area include Santa Elena peak, Pandura, and the Cayey Range.  Yabucoa valley consists mainly of farmland. It was originally a small mountain town.

History 

The name Yubucoa means "place or site with waters", although some scholars believe it means "place of cassava". The area was founded in 1793 when Manuel Colón de Bonillas and his wife, Catalina Morales Pacheco, donated the settlement. Puerto Rico was a Spanish colony until 1898, when it became a U.S. territory. Economic hardship dates back to the 17th and 18th centuries. Although briefly resolved, such hardships play a key role in the story of Dead Dog Beach. Yabucoa received popularity when in 1989 the WBO held a boxing championship there between Orlando Fernandez and Julio Gervacio. Fernandez' victory brought attention to the town and to Puerto Rico.

Before becoming known as "Dead Dog Beach," Playa Lucia was a popular beach. It consisted of a pool, cabana facilities and other recreational activities. It became a wasteland: the pool was covered in graffiti, and full of garbage. The facilities were abandoned and without proper maintenance turned into ruins. The only visitors who roamed the area were dogs and cats among piles of pet carcasses. As of 2014, a gate was put up to deny access to people who would dump dogs on the beach and Sato Project has been regularly monitoring the beach for strays.

Causes

Economy 
The economy of Puerto Rico weakened under the weight of the 2017 hurricanes. Many individuals were forced to abandon their pets. Local shelters filled and individuals left the island.

Culture 
The practice of not spaying and neutering pets causes population to expand rapidly. A majority of Puerto Rican pet owners believe that sterilization is not "natural" and/or "kills their sex life". Other owners breed their animals as a source of income. Some individuals go so far as to argue that it is less humane to kill their pet's "sex lives" than to actually kill the pet.

Rescue projects

SATO Project 

The Sato Project is an animal rescue project that operates across the territory while mainly focusing on Dead Dog Beach. Launched in 2011 by Chrissy Beckles and her husband Bobby Beckles, it is the official rescue group in Yabucoa. The Sato Project is composed of teams that work together to ship the dogs to the continental U.S. The Sato Project began a multi-phase campaign to facilitate and promote free spaying and neutering events in the area.

Other rescue operations 
The Animal Rescue Foundation is an animal rescue project started in 1997 which primarily operates in Rincon. Its main focus is to rescue dogs and cats, provide spaying/neutering and adoption services, and to educate the community about pet safety.

Barks For Hope is a rescue foundation started by Leo Roubian in 2014. Its primary goal is to provide aid and adoption for abandoned animals throughout the island. The operation offers transportation and medical care, including rehabilitation and rides to be spayed and neutered.

Brevard Humane Society | Spay-A-Thon | ViDAS (Veterinarios Internacionales Dedicados a Animales Sanos) 
The initiative, known as “Spay-A-Thon” for Puerto Rico, aims to provide high-quality, high-volume spay/neuter services to 20,000 animals in underserved communities across the Commonwealth by May 2019. With the support of Governor Ricardo Rosselló and First Lady Beatriz Rosselló, the Brevard Humane Society, located in Brevard County, Florida, was the only local animal welfare organization to participate in this historic endeavor.
In the aftermath of Hurricane Maria, the most destructive storm on record in Puerto Rico, Dr. Zenaida Agriat-Rodriguez, veterinarian for Brevard Humane Society, joined ViDAS (Veterinarios Internacionales Dedicados a Animales Sanos) for a spay/neuter clinic in the territory’s second largest city, Ponce.
“We couldn’t be happier to help a community that was ravaged by a devastating hurricane which left thousands of animals homeless. This collaboration will undoubtedly make a real difference and impact on the welfare of Puerto Rico’s pets.” said Theresa Clifton, Executive Director of the Brevard Humane Society.

Individual rescue efforts 
Stephen McGarva moved to Puerto Rico in 2005, and, while exploring his new home, came face-to-face with the animals' plight. McGarva began feeding the dogs and cleaning their wounds daily, in the hope to make them more adoptable. McGarva remained in the territory for several years to take care of the animals before returning the U.S. where by sharing his experiences, raised awareness of the animal crisis in Puerto Rico.

References

Further reading 
 Robin, Finn. "The Saviour of Dead Dog Beach Boxing Champ Rescues Puerto Rico's unwanted dogs." Hamilton Spectator, The (ON) n.d.: Newspaper Source Plus. Web. October 18, 2016.
  Heather Long. "Puerto Rico, amid Economic Crisis, Has Become 'Dead Dog Island'" Las Vegas Review Journal (2016): n. pag. Las Vegas Review-Journal. March 21, 2016. Web. October 27, 2016.

External links
 Photos taken at Dead Dog Beach (2011-2013) by Sophie Gamand

Beaches of Puerto Rico
Yabucoa, Puerto Rico